Tachypeles is a genus of beetles in the family Carabidae, containing the following species:

 Tachypeles bechynei Deuve, 2004 
 Tachypeles boulardi Deuve, 2004 
 Tachypeles davidsoni Deuve, 2004 
 Tachypeles degallieri Deuve, 2005 
 Tachypeles durantoni Deuve, 2004 
 Tachypeles hudsoni Deuve, 2004 
 Tachypeles lecordieri Deuve, 2001 
 Tachypeles moraguesi Deuve, 2005 
 Tachypeles moretellus Deuve, 2005 
 Tachypeles moretianus Deuve, 2004 
 Tachypeles parallelipipedus Deuve, 2004 
 Tachypeles perraulti Deuve, 2004 
 Tachypeles rossii Deuve, 2004 
 Tachypeles seriatopunctatoides Deuve, 2005 
 Tachypeles shushufindiensis Deuve, 2005 
 Tachypeles troglobioticus Deuve, 2004

References

Paussinae